Schoolhouse Rock! 50th Anniversary Singalong is an American music television special that premiered on February 1, 2023, on ABC. Hosted by Ryan Seacrest and spun off from ABC's 2020 specials The Disney Family Singalong, the special featured performances of songs by Schoolhouse Rock! by celebrity guests. This special celebrates the franchise's 50th anniversary. This special was dedicated to George Newall who co-created some of the songs.

Performances

Appearances
Quinta Brunson
Lisa Ann Walter
Shaquille O'Neal

Broadcast
This special was watched by 2.65 million viewers.

References

External links

2023 television specials
American Broadcasting Company television specials
Music television specials
Schoolhouse Rock!
Sing-along television shows